Belgrade, Texas, is a ghost town in Newton County, in the U.S. state of Texas. Located near Farm-to-Market Road 1416 and a mile west of the Sabine River, Belgrade was once a thriving community until the beginning of the Civil War. Now abandoned, a cemetery still remains, as well as a centennial marker. It was named after Belgrade, the capital of Serbia.

References

Ghost towns in East Texas
Populated places in Newton County, Texas